DaVonte Lambert (born June 23, 1994) is an American football defensive tackle for the Arlington Renegades of the XFL. He played college football at Auburn.

Professional career

Tampa Bay Buccaneers
Lambert signed with the Tampa Bay Buccaneers as an undrafted free agent following the 2016 NFL Draft.

On September 1, 2017, Lambert was placed on injured reserve.

On September 1, 2018, Lambert was waived by the Buccaneers.

St. Louis BattleHawks
Lambert played with the St. Louis BattleHawks of the XFL in 2020. He had his contract terminated when the league suspended operations on April 10, 2020.

Carolina Panthers
On April 30, 2020, Lambert signed with the Carolina Panthers. He was waived on August 28, 2020.

References

External links
Tampa Bay Buccaneers bio

1994 births
Living people
People from Burke County, Georgia
People from Jefferson County, Georgia
Players of American football from Georgia (U.S. state)
American football defensive tackles
Auburn Tigers football players
Tampa Bay Buccaneers players
Carolina Panthers players